Smugglers of Death is a 1959 Czechoslovak drama directed by Karel Kachyňa. The film is about members of SNB who guard Czechoslovak border in 1948. The film was viewed by more than 4 million people after its release in 1959.

Plot
The film is set in Šumava mountains, Czechoslovakia in 1948. People there illegally cross the border through the swampy area aided by a mysterious smuggler. Local SNB is aided in investigation by a young Sergeant Karel Zeman. He falls in love with a local shopkeeper Marie Rysová, whose husband escaped to the West. They become lovers but her husband unexpectedly shows up one day. He forces her to escape with him across the border and kills an SNB officer. They are led by a mysterious smuggler while Zeman chases them. Marie tries to run away but drowns in a swamp. Her husband is killed by the smuggler. Zeman then investigates and manages to track down the smuggler.

Cast
 Radovan Lukavský as Lt. Václav Kot	
 Jiří Vala as Sgt. Karel Zeman	
 Jaroslav Marvan as Border control officer Beran
 Jiřina Švorcová as Marie Rysová
 Stanislav Remunda as Pavel Rys
 Miroslav Holub as Gamekeeper Paleček
 Jiří Holý as Galapetr
 Rudolf Jelínek as Sgt. Cigánek
 Vladimír Menšík as Sgt. Baryška
 Ilja Prachař as SNB Commander

References

External links
 

1959 crime drama films
1959 films
Czech adventure films
Czech crime drama films
1950s Czech-language films
Czechoslovak drama films
Films directed by Karel Kachyňa
1950s Czech films